This is the discography page for the electronic industrial group Front 242.

Albums

Studio albums

Live albums

Remix albums 
 1995 -

Compilation albums 
 1987 - Back Catalogue

EPs
 1983 - Endless Riddance
 1983 - Two in One
 1984 - Live in Chicago
 1985 - Politics of Pressure
 1986 - Interception
 1991 - Mixed by Fear
 1993 - Angels Versus Animals
 1998 - Headhunter 2000
 2003 - Still & Raw

Singles

Video albums

Notes

References

Discographies of Belgian artists
Electronic music discographies
Front 242